Dighton-Rehoboth Regional High School is a high school in North Dighton, Massachusetts, United States.  it is part of the Dighton-Rehoboth School District which also serves the neighboring town, Rehoboth, Massachusetts. It was founded in 1961.

The school educates students in 9th through 12th grades. Student enrollment is approximately 1,000. It has over 80 educators and a student-to-teacher ratio of 14 to 1.

School facilities
The school has a library, a yearbook, and an on-site nurse.

It features both academic and vocational curricula, as well as enrichment in music (such as choir and band) and other arts and special education. Academic coursework focuses on language arts, mathematics, science and social studies as well as Latin, Spanish, and Portuguese for foreign languages. Other courses at the school focus on current events, and technology.

Extracurricular activities

Extracurricular activities and clubs at the school include:
 Mock Trial – which has come in the top sixteen for the state four years running
 Theatre Company – Director Ellen O'Reilly-LaSalle. Past performances over the past 15 years have included Cats, Evita, Big Fish, The Drowsy Chaperone, Beauty and the Beast, Xanadu, The Little Mermaid, and numerous others. The director is known for including technical choreography and big dance numbers not seen in most High School productions.
 Student Government – which oversees many student outreach programs and events, including Prom
 National Honor Society
 Environmental Club
 A large Leo Club presence
 DECA – prepares emerging leaders and entrepreneurs in marketing, finance, hospitality and management in high schools and colleges around the globe.
 Dighton-Rehoboth Marching Band – The band has made numerous trips to Disney World to perform for crowds of thousands on Main Street of the Magic Kingdom. The DRMB has had the honoring of performing for 94 HJY, the Taunton Christmas Parade, and represented the state of Massachusetts in the National Fourth of July Parade in Washington D.C. in 2014.
 Gender Alliance Club and a self-care club 

as well as many other clubs and organizations.

Sports
The Dighton-Rehoboth Falcons have a number of teams, such as 
 Wrestling
 Lacrosse
 Track
 Cross country 
 Golf 
 Soccer 
 Basketball 
 Football
 Baseball/softball
 Tennis
 Volleyball
 Cheerleading
 Field hockey
 Ice hockey (joint team with Seekonk)

Incidents

Live Ammunition 
On June 8th, 2022 a student found live ammunition inside the men's student bathroom. The school went into lockdown shortly after the discovery. The school was searched and it was declared that there was no credible threat.

Notable alumni
 Rod Correia, Former MLB player (California Angels)

References

External links
Official website
Dighton-Rehoboth Regional High School at Facebook
Student-Parent Handbook for 2011-12
Dighton Rehoboth School District

1961 establishments in Massachusetts
Educational institutions established in 1961
Public high schools in Massachusetts
Schools in Bristol County, Massachusetts
Dighton, Massachusetts